Margot Bengtsson (born 1943) is a Swedish psychologist and Reader in Psychology at Lund University. She is known for her research in developmental, social, feminist and critical psychology, especially her research on gender, power, identity and social class.

Bengtsson earned her PhD in psychology at Lund University in 1983 and was appointed as a Reader in Applied Psychology at Lund University in 1986. Her early work "focused on how society's needs for women to enter the workforce co-varied with trends in psychological research about sex differences." Her later work has "pursued the interactions between larger political changes and changes in gendered identities of Swedish young people."

Selected publications
Feminism och psykologi, Studentlitteratur, 2017, 
Tid, rum, kön och identitet ; om föräldraidentifikationens omvandlingar 1959-1993, Studentlitteratur, 2001, 
Könssocialisation och social förändring, 1990
Om maskulinitet ; mannen som forskningsprojekt (with Jonas Frykman), 1987
Makt och kön (ed.), 1986
Identifikation, kön och klass, 1983
"Det personliga är politiskt - en berättelse om hur jag upplevt kvinnorörelsen", in Ord & bild 86(1977):2/3

References

External links
List of publications incl. journal articles available from Swedish libraries

Swedish psychologists
Swedish women psychologists
Social psychologists
Gender studies academics
Academic staff of Lund University
Living people
1943 births
Swedish women academics